CPAS  may refer to:

Centre for the Public Awareness of Science
Central Procurement Accounting System, logistics and supply chain management system for the United States Air Force
Chinese Public Administration Society
Church Pastoral Aid Society, an Anglican evangelical mission agency
Collaborative Process Automation Systems
Centre public d'action sociale, the French term for the Public Centre for Social Welfare in Belgium